A lock hospital was an establishment that specialised in treating sexually transmitted diseases. They operated in Britain and its colonies and territories from the 18th century to the 20th.

History 
The military had a close association with a number of the hospitals. By the mid-19th century most of the larger army bases in India were home to a lock hospital. There were more military than civil lock hospitals in India, due to the prevalence of venereal diseases amongst British troops.  In 1858 the Admiralty paid to have one opened in Portsmouth and in 1863 another in Plymouth.

The earliest lock hospitals in India were established around 1797 at Berhampur, Kanpur, Danapur, and Fatehgarh. They were usually within bazaars, surrounded by a mud wall and staffed by a doctor and a female nurse. The local police were in charge of rounding up women suspected of being diseased, who could return home only after obtaining a certificate of discharge.

Lock Hospital operated in Hong Kong from 1858 to 1894 to deal with venereal diseases.

The term "lock hospital" originates from their use as leprosariums, in which the patients were kept in restraints.

See also
London Lock Hospital
Westmoreland Lock Hospital, Dublin
Contagious Diseases Acts
Glasgow Lock Hospital

References

External links 
 Reports on Lock hospitals in India
 Australian news article about Bernier and Dorre Island history

Hospitals by medical condition
Sexual health
History of the British Empire
Women's health in the United Kingdom